Charli is the third studio album by English singer and songwriter Charli XCX. It was released through Asylum and Atlantic Records UK on 13 September 2019.

The album is supported by a world tour, beginning in Atlanta on 20 September 2019. Charli was preceded by the singles "1999" with Troye Sivan, "Blame It on Your Love" featuring Lizzo, and "Gone" with Christine and the Queens. Charli was also promoted by the promotional singles "Cross You Out" featuring Sky Ferreira, "Warm" featuring Haim, "February 2017" featuring Clairo and Yaeji, and "2099" also featuring Sivan. The album was acclaimed by critics, who applauded the production and songwriting. Musically, it has been described as avant-pop, electropop, futurepop, and hyperpop.

Background and recording

In 2017, Charli XCX was preparing to release her third studio album. However, a hacker was able to steal several demo tracks from her Google Drive and leaked them online. Fans gave the collection of leaks the unofficial title XCX World, though a title and track list was never finalised for the album. After the leaks, Charli XCX decided to scrap the entire project and decided to remake a new album.

After a series of monthly single drops in the summer of 2018, Charli XCX released the lead single of the album, "1999" in October 2018. Charli XCX and executive producer A. G. Cook continued recording the album in November 2018 at Flume's studio in Los Angeles, California. The project was initially intended to be the third release in a trilogy of mixtapes, following the release of Number 1 Angel and Pop 2. The title was to include the number "3", continuing the numbering motif, but the plan was never finalised. After two weeks of recording, Charli XCX decided that the work would instead be her third studio album. Recording continued in Eagle Rock from January to March 2019, where the majority of the album's songwriting and production took place. The song "White Mercedes" was recorded in Andrew Watt's home. Initially trying to keep the "3" in the title, a working title for the album was Best Friends before Cook suggested the title Charli.

Release and promotion
On 13 June 2019, Charli XCX announced Charli, along with its cover art, release date, and track list that featured 15 tracks and 14 collaborations. Charli XCX debuted "Gone" with Christine and the Queens at Primavera Sound in Barcelona on 30 May and "2099" with Troye Sivan at the Go West Fest in Los Angeles on 6 June.

The album was supported by the Charli Live Tour. The tour was announced alongside the album's official reveal on 13 June 2019. The tour started on 20 September 2019 in Atlanta, United States and concluded in February 2020 in Australia.

Singles

The album's lead single is a collaboration with Australian singer Troye Sivan, titled "1999". It was released on 8 October 2018, and its music video was released on 11 October 2018. The album's second single is the original version of "Track 10", a song from Charli XCX's mixtape Pop 2, titled "Blame It on Your Love". It features American singer and rapper Lizzo, and was released on 15 May 2019. The album's third single, "Gone", is a collaboration with French singer and songwriter Christine and the Queens, the single features lyrics in both English, and French. It was released on 17 July 2019 alongside the track's music video. The fourth single "White Mercedes" was released on 23 October 2019. Its music video was released on 11 October 2019.

Promotional and remix singles
The first promotional single, "Cross You Out", features American singer-songwriter Sky Ferreira, and was released on 16 August 2019. The second promotional single, "Warm", features American pop-rock band Haim, and was released on 30 August 2019. The third promotional single, "February 2017", features American singer-songwriter Clairo and Korean-American electronic music artist Yaeji, and was released on 6 September 2019. The fourth and final promotional single, "2099", features Sivan and was released on 10 September 2019. A music video for "2099", showcasing Charli XCX and Sivan riding on jet skis, was released a week later on 17 September 2019.

The No Boys remix of "Click" was released on 11 October 2019. The remix keeps Kim Petras' verse from the original but replaces Tommy Cash with Slayyyter.

Critical reception

Charli was met with positive reviews from critics. At Metacritic, which assigns a normalised rating out of 100 to reviews from professional critics, the album received an average score of 80, based on 22 reviews. At AnyDecentMusic?, which uses a weighted formula to find an average rating out of 10, it received a score of 7.6 based on 22 reviews.

In a five-star review, Bethany Davison of The Skinny wrote "Charli is an expansive record, flooded with joy and heartache, consolidated in its array of features. Alongside indulgently unadorned ruminations on fear and love, the record is boundlessly liberating, decadently indulgent, and irresistibly danceable. Aitchison has delivered her greatest work yet". Valerie Magan of Clash awarded the album 9/10, commenting: "Charli is no doubt an album of too many features and too many parts, but it somehow all fits together in a way that allows her penchant for unconventional songwriting and her ear for an exciting melody to work in concert, creating a project better than most anything she's done in the past". Hannah Mylrea of NME stated that Charli is "Bold, brash and brilliant, this is Charli XCX at her most genuine, and it's dazzling." Neil McCormick of The Telegraph commented that "The sexy android cover and star-studded collaborations (including alternative icons Lizzo, Haim and Christine and the Queens) on her third album, Charli, suggest an all-guns-blazing pitch for blockbuster status. But the contents are far weirder than that implies. [...] Come the century's end, you can almost imagine future critics scratching their AI-augmented brains and still touting Charli XCX as the next big thing." The Line of Best Fit gave the album the "Album of the Week" designation, with Claire Biddles adding that "Charli is almost there. Ultimately she's too gloriously messy and multitudinous to produce such a thing. Although she could often benefit from an editor, her process and vision doesn't adhere to the music industry's prioritisation of the album format – which feels right for an artist whose music could be read as an attempt to dissolve time itself."

Mick Jacobs, writing for PopMatters, gave the album a 6/10 rating, noting that "compared to the previous compilations' sense of liberation, Charli sounds at odds with its some of its invested players and parts: the label, the fans, and Charli the artist." Jacobs praised the track "Silver Cross", but criticised others such as "Thoughts" and "Blame It on Your Love", which he described as "a unneeded revamp [that] seems to exists just because her and Lizzo share both a label and rising profiles in the industry." Rachel Aroesti of Q gave the album a mixed review, writing, "Between Cook's trademark production and the song-stealing brilliance of her collaborators, it often feels as if Aitchison's nasal croon and counter-intuitive toplines are the least interesting bits of her own project."

Year-end lists

Commercial performance
Charli debuted at number 14 on the UK Albums Chart with sales of 4,177 combined units. It opened at number forty-two on the US Billboard 200 with sales of 13,200 album-equivalent units, of which 5,500 were pure album sales.

Track listing

Notes
  signifies an additional producer
  signifies a vocal producer
  signifies a remix producer
 Physical releases of Charli credit Troye Sivan as a featured artist instead of a co-lead artist on "1999".
 "Next Level Charli" interpolates a section of "Selecta" by Mz. Bratt.

Personnel
Credits adapted from the album's liner notes.

Musicians and vocals

 Charli XCX – vocals
 A. G. Cook – programming , backing vocals, synthesizers 
 Christine and the Queens – vocals 
 Lotus IV – programming 
 Nicolas Petitfrère – programming 
 Sky Ferreira – additional vocals 
 Troye Sivan – additional vocals 
 Oscar Holter – programming, keyboards, bass, guitar 
 Kim Petras – additional vocals 
 Tommy Cash – additional vocals 
 Dylan Brady – soft synths, drum programming, harsh noise 
 Umru – drum programming, vocal processing, bass, synth sound design, "vibes" 
 Haim – additional vocals 
 Lizzo – additional vocals 
 Mikkel Eriksen – all drums, guitar, piano, synths, programming 
 Tor Erik Hermansen – all drums, guitar, piano, synths, programming 
 Andrew Watt – keyboards, guitar, programming 
 Happy Perez – keyboards, guitar, programming 
 Chad Smith – drums 
 Noonie Bao – backing vocals 
 Finn Keane – backing vocals, guitar, programming 
 Patrik Berger – synths, programming 
 Big Freedia – additional vocals 
 Cupcakke – additional vocals 
 Brooke Candy – additional vocals 
 Pabllo Vittar – additional vocals 
 Clairo – additional vocals 
 Yaeji – additional vocals 
 Planet 1999 – drum programming, synths, bass

Technical

 Charli XCX – executive production
 A. G. Cook – executive production, engineering 
 Geoff Swan – mixing 
 Şerban Ghenea – mixing 
 Mark "Spike" Stent – mixing 
 John Hanes – mix engineering 
 Niko Battistini – mixing assistance 
 Joe Burgess – mixing assistance 
 Michael Freeman – mixing assistance 
 Matt Wolach – mixing assistance 
 Umru – engineering 
 Aaron Joseph – engineering 
 David Rodriguez – engineering 
 Blake Mares – engineering 
 Gethin Pearson – engineering 
 Ben Lorio – engineering, recording for Big Freedia 
 Nömak – engineering 
 Planet 1999 – engineering 
 Katherline Yaeji Lee – engineering 
 Kourosh Poursalehi – engineering 
 Sean Klein – engineering 
 Stuart Hawkes – mastering 
 Randy Merrill – mastering 
 Clarence Clarity – mastering 
 AYA – mastering 
 Kevin Grainger – mastering 
 Lotus IV – recording for Sky Ferreira 
 Noah Passovoy – vocal recording 
 Peter Carlsson – vocal recording, vocal production 
 Mikkel Eriksen – recording 
 Thomas Warren – recording 
 Oscar Schiller – recording for Brooke Candy 
 Bastien Doremus – vocal engineering for Christine and the Queens 
 Tommy Cash – vocal engineering 
 Oscar Holter – vocal production 
 Andrew "Schwifty" Luftman – production coordination 
 Zvi "Angry Beard Man" Edelman – production coordination 
 Sarah "Goodie Bag" Shelton – production coordination 
 Drew "Grey Poupon" Salamunovich – production coordination 
 Jeremy "Jboogs" Levin – production coordination 
 David "Dsilb" Silberstain – production coordination 
 Samantha Corrie "SamCor" Schulman – production coordination

Design and artwork
 Jed Skrzypczak – creative design
 Ines Alpha – digital art

Charts

References
Footnotes

Citations

External links
Charli XCX Dissects Her Album, Track-By-Track, from Paper

2019 albums
Charli XCX albums
Albums produced by Stargate
Asylum Records albums
Atlantic Records albums
Albums produced by A. G. Cook
Albums produced by Linus Wiklund
Albums produced by Oscar Holter
Albums produced by 100 Gecs
Albums produced by Andrew Watt (record producer)
Albums produced by Happy Perez
Albums produced by Dylan Brady
Avant-pop albums